Palamutoba is a village in the Bayramiç District of Çanakkale Province in Turkey. Its population is 143 (2021).

References

Villages in Bayramiç District